Soldini is a surname of Italian origin. 

Soldini may also refer to:

Soldini, Santa Fe, town in Argentina
Calzaturificio fratelli soldini, Italian footwear manufacturer

See also
 Soldina